Lynchburg Regional Airport , also known as Preston Glenn Field, is a public use airport in Campbell County, Virginia, United States. It is located at the intersection of Route 29 South and Route 460, five nautical miles (6 mi, 9 km) southwest of the central business district of the City of Lynchburg, which owns the airport.  Opened in 1931, it was originally named Preston Glenn Airport in honor of Lt. Preston Glenn, a Lynchburg native who died while serving in World War I as an Army Air Corps pilot. Mostly used for general aviation, the airport is also served by one commercial airline, American Eagle Airlines flying on behalf of American Airlines with Canadair Regional Jet aircraft to Charlotte Douglas International Airport in Charlotte, North Carolina.

This airport is included in the National Plan of Integrated Airport Systems for 2011–2015, which categorized it as a primary commercial service facility. As per Federal Aviation Administration records, the airport had 83,392 passenger boardings (enplanements) in calendar year 2018, 86,366 enplanements in 2009, and 93,772 in 2010.

Facilities and aircraft
Lynchburg Regional Airport covers an area of 872 acres (353 ha) at an elevation of 938 feet (286 m) above mean sea level. It has two asphalt paved runways: 4/22 is 7,100 by 150 feet (2,164 x 46 m) and 17/35 is 3,386 by 75 feet (1,032 x 23 m).

The new extended runway opened on August 12, 2007.

For the 12-month period ending February 28, 2011, the airport had 85,974 aircraft operations, an average of 235 per day: 91% general aviation, 7% air taxi, and 2% military. At that time there were 77 aircraft based at this airport: 74% single-engine, 12% multi-engine, 8% jet, 5% helicopter, and 1% ultralight.

Airline and destination

As of December 2022, Lynchburg Regional Airport had 4 flights daily to and from Charlotte

Destination statistics

Former Airlines and destinations

Future prospects 
In December 2019, it was reported by local media that Lynchburg Regional Airport was experiencing a considerable increase in passenger traffic and demand for additional flights and routes. The airport was reportedly in talks with United Airlines to restart the Lynchburg to Washington-Dulles route and was also negotiating with Spirit Airlines to start flights to vacation destinations in Florida. 

Local media reported on December 1, 2021, that American Airlines is considering adding a new route to either Chicago or Philadelphia.

See also
Falwell Airport
Liberty University

References

External links
 Lynchburg Regional Airport at City of Lynchburg website
 Aerial image as of April 1994 from USGS The National Map
 
 

Airports in Virginia
Transportation in Lynchburg, Virginia
Buildings and structures in Campbell County, Virginia
Transportation in Campbell County, Virginia